Trachypepla contritella, the Kiwi Enigma, is a species of moth in the family Oecophoridae. Originally endemic to New Zealand this species can be found throughout that country.  However, from 2012 this species has been also been recorded in the United Kingdom. The preferred habitat of T. conritella is New Zealand native forest and larvae of this species are litter leaf feeders. Adults are on the wing from November to February in New Zealand and are attracted to light.

Taxonomy
This species was first described by Francis Walker in 1864 using a specimen collected by T. R. Oxley and named Gelechia contritella. In 1915 Edward Meyrick placed this species in the genus Trachypepla and synonymised Trachypepla nyctopis with this species. However J. S. Dugdale has raised doubts about this synonymisation as there are differences in the genitalia of specimens collected at the type localities of these species. George Hudson in his 1928 book The butterflies and moths of New Zealand described and illustrated this species. The female holotype specimen, collected in Nelson, is held at the Natural History Museum, London.

Description

Walker described the female of the species as follows:

Hudson described this species as follows:

This species is variable in both the richness of the ground colour, the markings on its forewings and the paler central area on the forewings. Hudson was of the opinion that the colouration of this moth imitated dull grey coloured lichens.

Distribution
This species was originally endemic to New Zealand and has been observed throughout that country. Since the 2010s this species has been observed in the United Kingdom. It was first observed at Eaton Ford in 2012, and has subsequently also been observed in Huntingdonshire.

Habitat and hosts

T. contritella inhabits native forest and in the South Island of New Zealand is common in beech forest. The larvae of this species feed on leaf litter. This species also feeds and pupates on lichen species in the genus Usnea.

Behaviour
Adults are on the wing in New Zealand in from November to February and are attracted to light.

References 

Moths described in 1864
Oecophorinae
Moths of New Zealand
Endemic fauna of New Zealand
Taxa named by Francis Walker (entomologist)
Endemic moths of New Zealand